Rudolf Kobelt (born 20 April 1943) is a Swiss wrestler. He competed in the men's freestyle middleweight at the 1964 Summer Olympics.

References

External links
 

1943 births
Living people
Swiss male sport wrestlers
Olympic wrestlers of Switzerland
Wrestlers at the 1964 Summer Olympics
Place of birth missing (living people)